Susann Goksør Bjerkrheim (born 7 July 1970, in Oslo) is a Norwegian former handball player.

She played in the clubs Nordstrand IF and Bækkelagets SK. She has played in 296 games for the Norwegian National team, scoring 844 goals. Between 1993 and 2000 she was the captain of the team.

She is a graduate of the Norwegian School of Sport Sciences.

She is married to teacher and handball player Svein Erik Bjerkrheim.

References

External links

1970 births
Living people
Norwegian female handball players
Olympic handball players of Norway
Olympic silver medalists for Norway
Olympic bronze medalists for Norway
Handball players at the 1988 Summer Olympics
Handball players at the 1992 Summer Olympics
Handball players at the 1996 Summer Olympics
Handball players at the 2000 Summer Olympics
Handball players from Oslo
Norwegian School of Sport Sciences alumni
Olympic medalists in handball
Medalists at the 2000 Summer Olympics
Medalists at the 1992 Summer Olympics
Medalists at the 1988 Summer Olympics